Alpha Unmanned Systems is a privately owned Spanish company based in Madrid, dedicated to the design, development and production of small unmanned aerial vehicles (sUAVs). Additionally, the company provides integration of flight control systems and payloads for ISTAR missions and non-military tasks.

History
Alpha Unmanned Systems, SL is a privately held independent company based in Madrid, Spain. Founded in 2014 by Juan Luque, Alvaro Escarpenter and Eric Freeman, the Alpha team includes aeronautical engineers, electronic engineers, mechanical engineers, UAV pilots and business professionals.

Alpha is led by Eric Freeman and Alvaro Escarpenter. The company offers solutions such as a ground control station, communications, and control software.

Applications
The Alpha 800 Helicopter is capable of performing the following missions:

Military Missions
 Intelligence gathering
 Communication relay
 Public safety missions
 Target acquisition 
 “Over the hill” surveillance

Civil
 Fire assessment
 Border patrol 
 Surveillance and inspection
 Electric Transmission line inspection

References

Unmanned aerial vehicle manufacturers of Spain
Manufacturing companies based in Madrid
Unmanned helicopters
Spanish brands
Aerospace companies of Spain